Latin Playboys is the debut album of experimental rock band Latin Playboys.

Critical reception

Robert Christgau of The Village Voice named the album the best release of 1994 and described it as "impressionistic fragments coalescing into a self-sustaining aural counterreality." Writing for The A.V. Club, Joshua Klein called the album a "casual masterpiece" consisting of "found sounds, low-fidelity recording techniques, distorted drum loops, deep-dungeon blues, fragmented guitar parts, and some gorgeous songs." In his AllMusic review, Richie Unterberger stated that the album's "lyrics and song structures are almost impressionistic in tone, creating an effect similar to listening to your car radio as stations drift in and out of reach while you drive along the Mexican border." Christgau later named it among his 10 best albums from the 1990s.

Track listing
All songs written by David Hidalgo and Louie Pérez.
 "Viva la Raza" – 2:45
 "Ten Believers" – 3:17
 "Chinese Surprize" – 3:07
 "Mira!" – 1:22
 "Manifold de Amour" – 2:02
 "New Zandu" – 3:11
 "Rudy's Party" – 2:28
 "If" – 1:41
 "Same Brown Earth" – 3:45
 "Lagoon" – 2:24
 "Gone" – 2:51
 "Crayon Sun" – 3:04
 "Pink Steps" – 2:07
 "Forever Night Shade Mary" – 3:05

Personnel
Bob Ludwig – mastering
John Paterno – mixing

References

1994 debut albums
Latin Playboys albums
Slash Records albums
Warner Records albums